The 1976 Mr. Olympia contest was an IFBB professional bodybuilding competition held in September, 1976 at Veterans Memorial Auditorium in Columbus, Ohio.

Results
The total prize money awarded was $5,000.

Over 200lbs

Under 200lbs

Overall winner

Notable events
Franco Columbu won his first Mr. Olympia title
 This contest was run by 6 time Mr. Olympia Arnold Schwarzenegger and businessman Jim Lorimer. Schwarzenegger had retired in 1975.

References

External links 
 Mr. Olympia

 1977
1976 in American sports
1976 in bodybuilding